The Little Fort Ferry is a cable ferry across the North Thompson River in British Columbia, Canada.

Technically, the ferry is a reaction ferry, which is propelled by the current of the water. An overhead cable is suspended from towers anchored on either bank of the river, and a "traveller" is installed on the cable. The ferry is attached to the traveller by a bridle cable. To operate the ferry, rudders are used to ensure that the pontoons are angled into the current, causing the force of the current to move the ferry across the river. 

The ferry operates under contract to the British Columbia Ministry of Transportation, is free of tolls, and runs on demand between 0700 and 1820. It carries a maximum of 2 cars and 12 passengers at a time.

See also
Adams Lake Cable Ferry
Arrow Park Ferry
Barnston Island Ferry
Big Bar Ferry
Francois Lake Ferry
Glade Cable Ferry
Kootenay Lake Ferry
Harrop Ferry
Lytton Ferry
McLure Ferry
Needles Ferry
Upper Arrow Lake Ferry
Usk Ferry

References

Ferries of British Columbia
Cable ferries in Canada